The 2014–15 season was Società Sportiva Lazio's 115th season since their founding and the club's 27th consecutive season in the topflight of Italian football.

Players

Transfers

In

Out

Competitions

Serie A

League table

Results summary

Results by round

Matches

Coppa Italia

Statistics

Appearances and goals

|-
! colspan=10 style="background:#B2FFFF; text-align:center"| Goalkeepers

|-
! colspan=10 style="background:#B2FFFF; text-align:center"| Defenders

|-
! colspan=10 style="background:#B2FFFF; text-align:center"| Midfielders

|-
! colspan=10 style="background:#B2FFFF; text-align:center"| Forwards

|-
! colspan=10 style="background:#B2FFFF; text-align:center"| Players transferred out during the season

Goalscorers

Last updated: 20 June 2015

References

S.S. Lazio seasons
Lazio